Geetanjali Medical College is a private medical college located in the city of Udaipur, Rajasthan.The college is attached to the Geetanjali Hospital which is a 1150 bedded tertiary care hospital . The batches up to 2011 are affiliated to the Rajasthan University of Health Sciences which conducts the examinations. Batches 2012 and onwards are affiliated to the Geetanjali University, which was established in 2011 covering an area of 25 acres

Courses Offered

Post Graduate courses
MD (Biochemistry)
MD (Anatomy)
M.Sc. (Anatomy)
MD (General Medicine)
MD (T.B. & Chest)
MD (Psychiatry)
M.Sc.(Biochemistry)
MD (Physiology)
M.Sc.(Microbiology)
MD (Dermatology (Skin & VD))
M.Sc.(Pharmacology)
MD (Pathology)
MD (Pharmacology)
MS (Orthopaedics)
M.Sc.(Physiology)
MD (Microbiology)
MS (ENT)
MS (Ophthalmology)
MD (Forensic Medicine)
MD (Community Medicine)
MD (Radio-diagnosis)
MD (Anaesthesia)
MD (Paediatrics)
MS (Obstetric & Gynecology)
M.H.A. (Master in Hospital Administration)
M.Sc. (Clinical Psychology)

Doctorate Programmes
Ph.D (Biochemistry)
Ph.D (Physiology)
Ph.D (Microbiology)
Ph.D (Community Medicine)
Ph.D (Forensic Medicine)
Ph.D (Pathology)
Ph.D (Pharmacology)
Ph.D (Anatomy)

See also
Udaipur
List of medical colleges in India
List of medical colleges in Rajasthan
 Colleges and institutes in India

References

External links
 

Medical colleges in Udaipur
Educational institutions established in 2008
2008 establishments in Rajasthan
Private medical colleges in India
Medical colleges in Rajasthan